The 16th Ice Hockey World Championships and 27th European Hockey Championships was held from February 12 to 20, 1949, in Stockholm, Sweden. The event was the first World Championships during the presidency of Canadian W. G. Hardy. The International Ice Hockey Federation allowed for an unlimited number of entrants, after rejecting a proposal to limit the event to eight teams.

In the initial round, the ten teams participating were divided into three groups: two groups of three and one of four.  In the second round, the top two teams in each group advanced to the medal round (for positions 1 through 6) with the remaining four teams advancing to the consolation round for places 7 through 10.

Czechoslovakia overcame tragedy to win their second world championship and ninth European Championship.  In November 1948 six Czechoslovak players (Ladislav Troják, Karel Stibor, Zdeněk Jarkovský, Vilibald Šťovík, Miloslav Pokorný and defenseman Zdeněk Švarc) were lost when their plane went missing crossing the English Channel.  Despite the key losses to their roster, they defeated the Sudbury Wolves, Canada's representative, three to two. It was only the third defeat for the Canadians at a World Championship.  The Americans were able to top the Czechoslovaks in the final round, which earned them a bronze medal, and kept the host Swedes off the podium.

World Ice Hockey Championship (in Stockholm, Sweden)

First round

Group A 

Standings

Group B 

Standings

Group C 

Standings

Consolation Round – places 7 to 10 

Standings

Final Round – places 1 to 6 

Standings

Final rankings – World Championships 

World Championships 1949
 Czechoslovakia

Team members

Final rankings – European Championships

Citations

References
Complete results

External links
The event at SVT's open archive 

Men's World Championships
IIHF Men's World Ice Hockey Championships
International ice hockey competitions hosted by Sweden
Ice Hockey World Championships
Ice Hockey World Championships
International sports competitions in Stockholm
Ice Hockey World Championships, 1949